777 is a professional cyclocross team which participates in elite races. The team registered with the UCI as a Belgian team under the name Steylaerts–777 for the 2018-2019 and as 777 for the 2019-2020 season.

Current team roster

References

Cycling teams established in 2019
UCI Continental Teams (Europe)
Cycling teams based in Belgium